"The Signal Fire" is a song by American metalcore band Killswitch Engage. The song was released as the third single from the album in August 2019. The song features guest vocals from Howard Jones, who was the band's lead vocalist from 2002 to 2012.

Reception
Several reviews noted "The Signal Fire" as being a highlight of Atonement.

Thom Jurek of AllMusic praised the "hard-grooving riffery" of the song and the performances of both Leach and Jones. J. Andrew of Metal Injection called the song the album's "most brutal moment" and called the addition of Jones on the song "an awesome fan-nerd moment, and a welcome combination of two of metal's most forceful voices." Ricky Aarons of Wall of Sound also praised Leach and Jones's performances, noting that the vocals of Jones were closer in style to what he used with Killswitch Engage compared to the style he uses in his current band Light the Torch.

Music video
The song's music video was directed by Ian McFarland.

The video shows the band performing the song in a rehearsal space, with Howard Jones sitting off to the side. During the chorus, Jones joins with the band in performing the song.

Personnel
Killswitch Engage
Jesse Leach – co-lead vocals
Adam Dutkiewicz – lead guitar, backing vocals
Joel Stroetzel – rhythm guitar
Mike D'Antonio – bass guitar
Justin Foley – drums

Guest musicians
Howard Jones – co-lead vocals

Charts

References

External links
Official Music Video at YouTube

2019 songs
2019 singles
Killswitch Engage songs